Recycling in Israel accounts for approximately 20% of waste in that country.

Relevant legislation
The two laws that most directly concern recycling in Israel are the Law to Protect Cleanliness (1984) and the Law for the Collection of Recycling (1993).

Law to Protect Cleanliness 
The Law to Protect Cleanliness:

bans the disposal of waste in public areas; and
requires local governments to establish sites for the collection and removal of garbage and recycling; and
sets fines for acts that violate provisions of this law; and 
mandates that funds raised from such fines go to a Fund for the Protection of Cleanliness.

Law for the Collection of Recycling 
The Law for the Collection of Recycling:

calls on local governments to establish areas for the collection and removal of recycling; and
allows the Minister for the Protection of the Environment to obligate local governments to establish such areas.

References

Israel
Environmental issues in Israel
Law of Israel
Waste law